Ohmatsugawa Dam is a gravity dam located in Akita Prefecture in Japan. The dam is used for flood control, irrigation, water supply and power production. The catchment area of the dam is 38.2 km2. The dam impounds about 74  ha of land when full and can store 12150 thousand cubic meters of water. The construction of the dam was started on 1975 and completed in 1998.

References

Dams in Akita Prefecture
1998 establishments in Japan